Nizamuddin Markaz, also called Banglewali Masjid, is a mosque located in Nizamuddin West in South Delhi, India. It is the birthplace and  global centre of the Tablighi Jamaat,
the missionary and reformist movement started by Muhammad Ilyas Kandhlawi in 1926.

Since 2015, frictions developed within the group over the leadership of the organisation, and factions have developed. The mosque continues to serve as the headquarters of the Nizamuddin faction of Tablighi Jamaat.

Building 

The New York Times describes the Markaz as "a tall, white, modern building towering over the Nizamuddin West neighborhood". It is said to be a centre of the neighbourhood's economy,  with money changers, guesthouses, travel agencies and gift shops surrounding it and catering to the missionaries that visit the Markaz. 

The building is six stories high, and is capable of housing about 2,000 people. It is adjacent to the Hazrat Nizamuddin Police Station, with which it shares a wall. The famous Khawaja Nizamuddin Aulia shrine is close by.

There is a Madrasa along with the Markaz Masjid named Kashiful Uloom.

Typical gatherings at the Markaz host 2,000–4,000 people. During the day, the large halls in the building are used for prayers and sermons. At night, they are used as sleeping quarters for 200–300 people on each floor.

History

Early history 
The Banglewali Masjid (Bungalow Mosque) was built in Nizamuddin by Mirza Ilahi Baksh, a relative of the last Mughal emperor, sometime after 1857. Maulana Muhammad Ismail, the father of Maulana Muhammad Ilyas Kandhlawi, established a madrasa in its premises under the name Kashif ul-Uloom. It is said that he used to go out and invite people to come to the mosque and, on one occasion, he happened to bring Meos from Mewat who were in Delhi as labourers. Noticing that they were not schooled in proper practice of prayer, he decided to teach it to them, which was the beginning of the madrasa.

After the death of Maulana Ismail and his elder son, MaulanaMuhammad Ilyas took up the task of teaching at the madrasa. He too was concerned with educating the Meos of Mewat. Noticing that his own direct teaching would be inadequate to the task, in time, he evolved the practices of tabligh that now form the foundation of Tablighi Jamaat. They involved turning ordinary Muslims into preachers. Training them in the preaching work became the main activity of the madrasa, gradually turning the Banglewali Masjid into a markaz (centre or headquarters). Ilyas also set up an organisational network for his fledgling organisation bringing men of influence to gather in the mosque. By the end of Ilyas's life, Tablighi Jamaat emerged as a national organisation with transnational potential.

Transnational centre 
Under Ilyas's son and successor, Muhammad Yusuf Kandhlawi (1917–1965), the Tablighi Jamaat expanded worldwide and became a transnational organisation. The Nizamuddin Markaz became the world headquarters (Aalami Markaz). According to a commentator, it is "the heart circulating blood through the body" for the Tablighi Jamaat organisation. It is the place where people are trained for missionary work, worldwide tours are organised and information to the entire worldwide network is distributed.

After Yusuf Kandhlawi's sudden death, the senior members chose Inamul Hasan Kandhlawi (1918–1995), a close relative of Maulana Ilyas, as the third amir.
After the 30-year leadership of Inamul Hasan, during which the movement grew to its present size, an executive council (shura) was established to share the responsibilities of leadership.

Recent developments 
According to scholar Zacharias Pieri, the final decision-making responsibility fell on two men within the shura: Zubair ul-Hasan Kandhlawi and Muhammad Saad Kandhlawi.
After Zubair ul-Hasan's death in 2014, Maulana Saad assumed the leadership of the council and the movement.
According to The Milli Gazette, the senior members of the Tablighi Jamaat from around the world met at the Pakistan regional markaz at Raiwind in 2015 and resolved that the organisation would be governed by a shura. Raiwind amir Muhammad Abdul Wahhab who was a member of the original shura backed  this effort.
Kandhlawi did not accept the recommendations of the meeting, causing a split in the organisation.

The friction led to division of the Tablighi Jamaat leadership into two groups, the first being led by Muhammad Saad Kandhlawi at the Nizamuddin Markaz, while the other being led by Ibrahim Dewla, Ahmed Laat and others at Nerul Markaz, Navi Mumbai in India. The Raiwind Markaz in Pakistan is part of the latter group and has become the "de facto base" of the shura group.

COVID-19 pandemic

The mosque organised a large congregation in March 2020, from 13 to 15 March, participants got stuck in the Markaz Building due to the sudden and surprise announcement of nationwide lockdown in India by the government. Although prior information was furnished with the Nizamiddin Police station, and parallel functions were also held near the same dates (belonging to other religions), some right wing media outlets made a big propaganda of this event as reason for Corona spread in the state.

See also
 Nerul Aalami Markaz, in Maharashtra
 Raiwind Markaz, in Pakistan
 Tongi Ijtema, in Bangladesh

References

Bibliography
 
 

Mosques in Delhi
Tablighi Jamaat